Geyikli can refer to:

 Geyikli
 Geyikli, Gönen
 Geyikli, Kastamonu
 Geyikli, Köprüköy
 Geyikli, Kozluk